John Noel, originally John Noel Linnen, is a British executive producer  and theatrical agent. He began his career in radio and music management before moving into television in the early 1990s. He established John Noel Management in 1977.

Noel is mostly known for being the producer of Bo' Selecta! and mainly works with Ben Palmer. He also manages Russell Brand, who credits Noel with saving his life by forcing him to go into drug rehabilitation.

Filmography
 Whatever I Want (2000)
 Bo' Selecta! (2003)
 Keith Lemon's Very Brilliant World Tour (2008)

References

External links
 
 John Noel Management

Living people
1952 births
British record producers
British television producers